The Pakistan Cricket Board (PCB) is a sports governing body for cricket in Pakistan responsible for controlling and organising all tours and matches undertaken by the Pakistan national cricket team. A member of the International Cricket Council since 1952, it represents the country's men's and women's national teams in international cricket tournaments played under the ICC.

Following the establishment of Pakistan as an independent dominion of the British Empire in 1947, professional and amateur cricket commenced in the same year, seeing as local infrastructure had already been established when the country was part of the British Raj. Cricket matches were arranged informally until 1948, when a Board of Control was formally instituted. Pakistan was admitted to the Imperial Cricket Conference (currently known as International Cricket Council) in July 1952, and has since been a full member, playing Test cricket. The team's first Test series took place in India between October and December 1952.

Inaugural Board of Control 
The Pakistan Cricket Board was inaugurated on 1 May 1949 as the Board of Control for Cricket in Pakistan (BCCP). The first meeting, held in the committee rooms of Lahore Gymkhana, saw HE Iftikhar Hussain Khan Mamdot, the Nawab of Mamdot, made president and chairman, with Justice A. R. Cornelius as one of three vice-presidents. The following year, Cornelius became chairman of the working committee, until he relinquished his connection with the board in early 1953.

The working chairman was always one of the three vice-presidents. In April 1957, Ayub Khan imposed three more new vice-presidents (himself being one of them). Then between December 1958 and September 1969 the post of vice-president disappeared.

Committees
The response to turmoil within the board has on four occasions been to suspend the rules and appoint an ad hoc committee. The first ad hoc committee was appointed in September 1960 and did not disband until May 1963 having created a new constitution. The President of Pakistan would now nominate the board president who would in turn nominate the other members of the executive committee to sit for a period of three years. Representatives of the four provincial cricket associations and Government departments formed the executive committee.

The BCCP was re-organised in the 1970s and was headed by former cricketers, professional administrators and trustees, who were often businessmen. In November 1976 players' demands for increased salaries reached a crisis and the Pakistan Sports Board took over running the B.C.C.P.'s affairs. Long-serving president, the formidable Kardar, was in the thick of the dispute. The revolt against Kardar forced him to resign in May 1977 and led to a new Ad Hoc Committee replacing the Board Council in 1978 running Pakistan cricket and again changing the constitution. Provincial Cricket Associations were eliminated and divisional and city CAs became members, giving most of the influence to the city Cricket Association of Lahore and Karachi.

The Board now governed a network of teams sponsored by corporations and banks, city associations and clubs. There is no province-based official team type organisation of domestic cricket in Pakistan and Lahore and Karachi cities are the two top tiers of all cricket, including reservoirs of fresh talent.

Pakistan cricket was involved by dissension and controversies over the national team's poor performance during the tour of India and a public uproar forced the end of the Ad Hoc Committee. The chairman and team captain Asif Iqbal had to step down. Air Marshal Nur Khan now became chairman and he saw the banks and other organisations increase their participation on the Board Council in the face of protests from the zonal organisations.

A third ad hoc committee under Javed Burki took charge of BCCP affairs in January 1994 and made a new constitution including giving a new name, the Pakistan Cricket Board (P.C.B.) It introduced a chairman and chief executive.

After taking heavy criticism on the grounds of corruption and match fixing, the Board was taken over by a fourth Ad Hoc Committee formed on 17 July 1999 which remains in place despite undertakings from Musharraf to bring it to an end. The Pakistan Cricket Board re-emerged by taking the initiative to sponsor the hugely successful 2004 tour of Pakistan by their rivals India. The Pakistan Cricket Board has competed and has associated itself with the Twenty20 cricket form and has also proven popular and hopes to similarly revive popular interest in domestic games. However, Pakistan's early exit from the 2007 World Cup cast a shadow and later Dr. Nasim Ashraf's resigned at the end of 2008.

Ejaz Butt was named the PCB Chairman in October 2008. Zaka Ashraf took over from Butt in October 2011.

On 28 May 2013, Zaka Ashraf was suspended as PCB Chairman by Islamabad High Court due to a dubious election. The newly sworn in Government of Nawaz Sharif named Najam Sethi as acting PCB Chairman. On 15 October 2013, the governing council of the Pakistan Cricket Board was dissolved by the Prime Minister of Pakistan, Nawaz Sharif, and an interim five man management committee was named consisting of acting chairman Najam Sethi‚ Shahryar Khan, two former players (Zaheer Abbas and Haroon Rasheed, and former team manager Naveed Cheema.

On 15 January 2014, Zaka Ashraf was reinstated as PCB Chairman. The PML-N Government was unhappy with the reinstatement (since Ashraf was a PPP appointee), and this led to Ashraf's sacking. In February, PCB Governing Board was dissolved and an eight-member management committee (comprising Shakil Sheikh, Shaharyar Khan, Zaheer Abbas, Iqbal Qasim, Naveed Akram Cheema, Yusaf Naseem Khokar and Faridullah Khan, the secretary IPC). Najam Sethi was elected as chairman by the management committee.

Domestic cricket

The structure of domestic cricket in Pakistan at the highest level has changed many times since 1947 with the latest restructure being enforced in 2019. Previously domestic cricket operated with departmental, city and regional teams - a set up encouraged by Abdul Hafeez Kardar. Since 1947, the domestic first class cricket system has varied considerably per year with teams ranging from 7 to 26 and tournament matches operating under different formats (often changes occurred every year). With the advent of domestic List A and T20 forms of cricket in the 1970s and 2000s, there has been no consistent set up (as has been noted for first class cricket in Pakistan). Historically, school and club cricket has also suffered due to inconsistencies in top tier domestic cricket. The consistent changes in the domestic structure and the gradual introduction of departmental teams was encouraged as it provided permanent jobs to players. Matches were rarely televised due to lack of quality cricket and lack of interest in departmental cricket. This inconsistent system was widely criticised on the basis of low quality cricket and reduced competition. 

In 2019, six regional teams were created on provincial lines. The teams would compete in the principal competitions in all three formats of the game: the Quaid-e-Azam Trophy (First Class), Pakistan Cup (List A) and National T20 Cup (Domestic T20). The PCB's rationale in reducing the number of teams in domestic cricket was to concentrate talent in order to increase competition and improve the quality of cricket. The new structure also consisted of corresponding second XI, under-19, under-16 and under-13 competitions, and live television coverage of top level matches. The restructuring also reorganised district level cricket into a three tier bottom-up system, with 90 city cricket associations supervising school and club cricket at grassroots level, and inter-city tournaments providing a stepping-stone to the six elite regional teams.

The six regional teams (operated by respective six cricket associations) ensure that the affairs of the associations at city level are regulated. They frame policies that will develop cricket at the grassroots, manage club cricket in collaboration with the 90 city associations and also oversee intra-city competitions. The teams are responsible for revenue generation through sponsorship, marketing and strategic collaborations with business conglomerates. Each of the six regional teams have a chief executive officer and a management committee that has been tasked with supervising all cricketing activities. These changes have been made by the PCB in order to decentralise the administrative body so that it can limit itself to a supervisory role by delegating responsibilities related to the development of the sport to the provincial associations. This tiered structure has been enshrined in the PCB constitution.

Governance of Pakistan cricket

Presidents and chairmen

Secretary

Chief executive officers

Headquarters 
The PCB headquarters are located near the Gaddafi Stadium, Lahore. All PCB Officials sit there during the weekdays from 9AM to 5PM.

PCB annual awards
Pakistan Cricket Board for the first time held inaugural awards in 2012. This new PCB initiative is meant to recognize, acknowledge and honour Pakistan's prime cricketing talent that has consistently stood out on the field of play.

PCB initiative to revive cricket in Pakistan

Australian envoy visits PCB headquarters

The Australian Higher Commissioner to Pakistan, Peter Heyward, visited the PCB headquarters at Gaddafi Stadium, Lahore on 3 September 2012. He appreciated the board's efforts to bring cricket back in Pakistan. He further said he always love to see the Australian team playing against Pakistan in front of Pakistani people and on their home grounds.

Asian Cricket Council Development Committee

The Asian Cricket Council Development Committee meeting was held in Islamabad on 24 September 2012 and was chaired by Zaka Ashraf. The Chairman PCB called on the members to come over to Pakistan to play cricket. ACC members assured the then Chairman of their support and Chief Executive of ACC Syed Ashraful Haq said they felt no security concern in Pakistan and considered playing cricket here to be safe as anywhere in the world.

ICC CEO visits NCA

David Richardson, the chief executive of the International Cricket Council, visited National Cricket Academy on 12 January 2013. He said that Pakistan Cricket Board is working very hard to bring International Cricket back to Pakistan and it is our role to support Pakistan Cricket Board in its efforts to revive international cricket whenever it is possible.

See also
 Pakistan Blind Cricket Council
 Pakistan Super League
 Pakistan Junior League

References

External links
 Official website

1948 establishments in Pakistan
Cricket Board
Cricket administration
Cric
Pakistan federal departments and agencies
Sports organizations established in 1948
Government agencies established in 1948